Monochamus bimaculatus is a species of beetle in the family Cerambycidae. It was described by Charles Joseph Gahan in 1888. It is known from Myanmar, Vietnam, India, Malaysia, Taiwan, Laos, and Thailand. It contains the varietas Monochamus bimaculatus var. ingranulatus.

It feeds on Cinnamomum camphora and Mallotus philippensis.

References

bimaculatus
Beetles described in 1888